Snowy White is the second album by blues guitarist Snowy White, released in 1984.

The album was issued as Land of Freedom in some territories, featuring a different photograph on the album cover and White's UK No. 6 hit single "Bird of Paradise" appended as a ninth track. It was reissued on CD in 1997 with two bonus tracks: "Muddy Fingers", a non-album B-side, and "Someone Else", an outtake from the album sessions.

Track listing

Personnel

Musicians
 Snowy White – guitars, vocals
 Winston Delandro – guitar
 Kuma Harada – bass guitar
 Godfrey Wang – keyboards
 Niels Jannette-Walen – English horn, oboe d'amour, lyricon, string arrangements
 Richard Bailey – drums, percussion
 Linda Taylor – backing vocals
 Tessa Niles – backing vocals

Technical
 Kuma Harada – producer 
 Snowy White, Martin Adam – co-producers
 Martin Adam – engineer 
 Mark Stent – assistant engineer
 Dennis Blackham – mastering at Tape One, London
 Lawrence Lawry – photography 
 The Advertising Business Ltd. – sleeve design

References

Snowy White albums
1984 albums